Lelantos or Lelantus is a minor mythological figure that appears in the late epic Dionysiaca by Nonnus of Panopolis, written in the early fifth century AD.

Dionysiaca 
Lelantos is the Titan father of the nymph Aura ("Breeze"), who was a hunting companion of Artemis and the mother, by Dionysus, of Iacchus, a minor deity connected with the Eleusinian Mysteries. Lelantos was married to the Oceanid nymph Periboea, whom Nonnus seems to imply was Aura's mother, although elsewhere, he calls Aura the "daughter of Cybele", the Phrygian mother-goddess. Lelantos's own parentage is not touched upon.

See also 
 Leto
 Lethe
 Sangarius

Citations

General and cited references 
 Bernabé and García-Gasco, "Nonnus and Dionysiac-Orphic Religion" in Brill's Companion to Nonnus of Panopolis, editor Domenico Accorinti, BRILL, 2016. .
 Grimal, Pierre, The Dictionary of Classical Mythology, Wiley-Blackwell, 1996, .
 Nonnus, Dionysiaca; translated by Rouse, W H D, I Books I–XV. Loeb Classical Library No. 344, Cambridge, Massachusetts, Harvard University Press; London, William Heinemann Ltd. 1940. Internet Archive
 Nonnus, Dionysiaca; translated by Rouse, W H D, III Books XXXVI–XLVIII. Loeb Classical Library No. 346, Cambridge, Massachusetts, Harvard University Press; London, William Heinemann Ltd. 1940. Internet Archive

External links 
 LELANTOS from The Theoi Project

Greek gods
Titans (mythology)